Ruoho is a surname. Notable people with the surname include:

Esa Ruoho (born 1978), known as Lackluster, Finnish musician 
Jussi Ruoho (1892–1975), Finnish athlete
Marita Ruoho (born 1949), Finnish orienteer
Veera Ruoho (born 1969), Finnish politician and taekwondo practitioner